The Accüsed is an American crossover thrash band from Seattle founded in 1981. The band was a progenitor of the crossover style that bridged the gap between thrashcore and thrash metal, later influencing grindcore and some crust punk bands; as well as an influential band in the Seattle area alternative scene. The band calls their music "splattercore", and their zombie mascot, Martha Splatterhead, appears on most of their albums. Common themes involve social issues and Martha Splatterhead coming back from the dead to slaughter rapists and child molesters.

History

Early years (1981–1992)
The Accüsed was created in 1981 in Oak Harbor, Washington, by bassist Chibon "Chewy" Batterman, drummer Dana Collins, and guitarist Tommy Niemeyer. John Dahlin was the vocalist from 1982 to 1984. The band's first two demo cassettes and their album, Please Pardon Our Noise, It Is the Sound of Freedom, released in 1983 drew heavily from hardcore punk. In 1984, the Fartz vocalist Blaine Cook replaced Dahlin.

In 1984, the band began adopting metal into their sound and dubbed their style "splatter rock", in 'homage' to their favorite genre of horror films. According to a review, "Their hybrid musical formula was distinguishable by Cook's unusual choking-sound vocals, Niemeyer's muted, choppy, buzz-saw guitars, dark metallic riffs, and Dana Collins rapid-fire, double-kick drumming." The band also created the zombie mascot, Martha Splatterhead, whose likeness (created by Niemeyer) adorns most of their albums and many of their promotional items. A recurring theme in the band's lyrics involve Martha Splatterhead coming back from the dead to eviscerate and slaughter rapists and child molesters.

They released their first full EP, Martha Splatterhead, in 1985 on their own Condar label. Their first full-length LP was The Return of Martha Splatterhead, released on Subcore Records, and later re-released on Earache Records (the first mosh album), in 1986.

According to reviewer Jeb Branin, "I was writing for a zine in Canada called Northern Metal that reviewed the new LP The Return Of Martha Splatterhead giving it a 0.0 rating and absolutely crucifying it in the review. It is the only 0.0 review I remember ever seeing in Northern Metal. They hated it so much I knew I had to buy it. As I suspected, the album was a masterpiece of hardcore hysteria."

The LPs More Fun Than an Open Casket Funeral and Martha Splatterhead's Maddest Stories Ever Told quickly followed, as well a number of other annual releases. Starting with Hymns For the Deranged, the band also began working with Seattle producer Jack Endino, and their next album, Grinning Like an Undertaker, with Josh Sinder now on drums, was released on Nastymix Records followed by the EP "Straight Razor".

The band maintained an active touring schedule, and according to a review, "...live, The Accüsed were untouchable ... the whole band was a frenzy of epileptic gyrations, although Blaine's high flying leaps and bouncing off the walls like a deranged gnome were definitely the highlight ... even in today's underground you aren't going to find a more devastating band than The Accüsed."

The Accüsed took an 11-year hiatus in 1992, with members taking time to play in other Seattle bands, such as the Fartz and Gruntruck.

Re-formation (2003–2010 and 2019)

The Accüsed re-formed in 2003, playing live shows in the Seattle area, and in 2005 released the album Oh, Martha! on the band's CONDAR label. This "comeback record" landed on Revolver magazine's Top Ten Albums of the Year and writer's lists from Metal Maniacs magazine. Oh, Martha! followed the tradition of many earlier releases by The Accüsed in that it featured a track with a guest lead singer. In this case, guitarist Tommy Niemeyer sang lead vocals on the angry "13 Letters" (though no lead vocal credit was printed on the album). In 2006 a limited-edition, split 7-inch with Whidbey Island, Washington's punk icons Potbelly was released. The Accüsed 2003 reunion line-up was short-lived, however, as a newly reformed version of the band surfaced in 2006, and yet another incarnation in Summer 2019.

In an interview with Rock-A-Rolla, Tom Niemeyer stated that, during one of the band's many line-up changes, Mike Patton (of Mr. Bungle) was approached for the role of vocalist, with Patton ultimately declining Niemeyer's offer due to being "totally booked up". Patton did suggest Brad Mowen (ASVA, Burning Witch, Mommy, Master Musicians of Bukkake, et al.) who joined The Accüsed in 2006. The 'new' line-up released two new songs, via free download, "Scotty Came Back" and "Fuck Sorry", January 26, 2007.

In 2009, the band released their sixth full-length album, The Curse of Martha Splatterhead, via Southern Lord Records. The album's first pressing sold-out quickly and received widespread critical praise, forcing Southern Lord Records into a hasty 2nd-pressing of the CD title only weeks after its release. In 2010, the band was included as a part of the soundtrack for Namco Bandai Games' 2010 remake of Splatterhouse.

As of April 28, 2019, the Accüsed are, according to founding member and guitarist, Niemeyer, "...once again active; with new material slated to be released Summer 2019, as well as a vintage 1983 Live gig from Missoula, Montana coming out on P.I.G. Records in 2019..." Niemeyer stated The ACCUSED would also be performing live gigs in select markets accompanying both releases in the summer of 2019. After several line-up changes, the band "...have returned with new songs, and releases of older, vintage material–both due out Summer 2019; with select LIVE appearances to follow..." according to band founder and guitarist Tommy Niemeyer. Drummer, Josh Sinder, from the Grinning Like An Undertaker and Straight Razor releases, will team up with Niemeyer as the band prepared to move ahead in the years to come.

In 2019, a lineup of former members Blaine Cook, Alex Sibbald, Steve Nelson, and Steve McVay joined forces as The Accüsed A.D. They released a  music video for "Juego Terminado," a song from a forthcoming album.)

Impact
Despite being frequently cited as an influence by other punk and metal bands, the Accüsed has largely remained in the underground. According to Sputnik Music, "It's a shame really [that] The Accüsed aren't recognized in the metal music industry as being one of the pioneering members of crossover thrash. These boys deserve more attention than they get."

Timeline

Discography

Albums
 1981: Brain Damage 1 (demo cassette)
 1982: Brain Damage 2 (demo cassette)
 1983: Please Pardon Our Noise, It Is a Sound of Freedom aka Accüsed/Rejectors Split (Fatal Erection)
 1985: Martha Splatterhead (EP, Condar)
 1986: The Return of Martha Splatterhead (LP, Subcore and Earache Records)
 1987: More Fun Than an Open Casket Funeral (LP, Combat Records)
 1987: 38 Song Archives Tapes 1981-86 (200 cassettes self-released by The Accüsed)
 1988: Martha Splatterhead's Maddest Stories Ever Told (LP, re-released in 1991 on Combat.)
 1988: Hymns for the Deranged (LP, Empty Records)
 1990: Grinning Like an Undertaker (LP, Sub Pop, Nastymix)
 1991: Straight Razor (EP, Nastymix)
 1992: Splatter Rock (LP, Nastymix)
 2006: Oh Martha! + Baked Tapes (double LP, Nuclear Blast) – 666 pressed
 2006: 34 Song Archives Tapes 1981-86 (Condar; #Cond002)
 2007: Why Even Try? (EP, Condar 2007)
 2009: The Curse of Martha Splatterhead (LP, Southern Lord)

Singles
 1989: Accüsed/Morphius Split (split 7-inch single, Empty)
 1992: Straight Razor (Fantagraphix Comics)
 2002: Paint It Red
 2005: Songs of Horror and Alcoholism (split 7-inch with Potbelly, PB Records)

Album track listings

Martha Splatterhead's Maddest Stories Ever Told
 "Psychomania"  
 "Bag Lady Song"  
 "Inherit the Earth"  
 "Deception" 
 "Molly's X-Mas"  
 "I'd Love to Change the World" (Ten Years After cover) 
 "You Only Die Once"   
 "Sick boy"   
 "Chicago"   
 "Starved to Death"   
 "War=Death"   
 "Maddest Story Ever Told"   
 "Intro"   
 "Scared of the Dark"   
 "Losing Your Mind"   
 "Smothered Her Trust"   
 "Lights Out"   
 "Hearse"

Catalog
The out-of-print back-catalog of The Accüsed's albums has been sporadically re-issued on various labels over recent years; a move prompted in part by the fact that many collectors of memorabilia by The Accüsed were seeing copies of the rare/out-of-print US-made CDs fetch hundreds of dollars each on the auction website eBay.

References 

American thrash metal musical groups
Musical quartets
Musical groups established in 1981
Musical groups disestablished in 1993
Hardcore punk groups from Washington (state)
Musical groups reestablished in 2003
Crossover thrash groups
Heavy metal musical groups from Washington (state)
Musical groups from Washington (state)